Préchacq is the name of several communes in France:
 Préchacq-les-Bains, Landes
 Préchacq-Josbaig, Pyrénées-Atlantiques
 Préchacq-Navarrenx, Pyrénées-Atlantiques

See also 
 Préchac (disambiguation)